The Companion 21 is an American trailerable sailboat that was designed by Aborn Smith Jr. and first built in 1981.

Production
Born in 1929, Smith, who went by the first name "Denny", had become a tugboat deckhand at age 15. When he turned 16 he joined the US Army and served in Japan. Returning home after the Second World War he established an automotive repair business, Smith's Auto Body, in Stonington, Connecticut, United States. An active sailboat racer, he decided to start a boat building business after retiring and designed four sailboats for production. He named his business Trump Yachts and it was located in Stonington. The Companion 21 was built by Trump Yachts  from 1981 to 1983. In 1984 the company was renamed Atlantic Yacht Services, moved to New London, Connecticut and went out of business in 1991. Smith died in 2007.

Design
The Companion 21 is a recreational keelboat, built predominantly of fiberglass, with wood trim. It has a masthead sloop rig, a spooned raked stem; a raised counter, angled transom; a keel-mounted rudder controlled by a tiller and a fixed long keel. It displaces  and carries  of ballast.

The design has sleeping accommodation for four people, with a double "V"-berth in the bow cabin and two straight settee quarter berths in the main cabin. There are no galley provisions. The head is located centered under the bow cabin "V"-berth.

Operational history
In a 2010 review Steve Henkel wrote, "built of quality materials (cast lead ballast, solid bronze rudder post, solid teak trim and jointerwork), this is the kind of small yacht a proud owner might like to just sit in and polish. At sea she will behave herself, and if you need to go somewhere fast, there's always the outboard engine, conveniently located in a notch in the middle of the transom. Worst features: Under sail she will be slow ... As one owner aptly wrote when advertising his Companion 20 for sale, 'Great boat for beginner or retired person.' Sailors with more experience will want something faster."

See also
List of sailing boat types

References

Keelboats
Dinghies
1980s sailboat type designs
Sailing yachts
Trailer sailers
Sailboat types built by Trump Yachts
Sailboat type designs by Aborn Smith Jr.